Göllheim is a municipality in the Donnersbergkreis, in Rhineland-Palatinate, Germany. It is situated north of the Palatinate forest, approx. 25 km west of Worms. It was the site of the 1298 Battle of Göllheim.

Göllheim is the seat of the Verbandsgemeinde ("collective municipality") Göllheim.

Buildings

Sculptures

References

Palatinate Forest
Donnersbergkreis